Yucca rupicola is a  plant in the family Asparagaceae, known as the twistleaf yucca, twisted-leaf yucca, Texas yucca or twisted-leaf Spanish-dagger. The species was described by George Heinrich Adolf Scheele in 1850. This is a small, acaulescent plant with distinctive twisted leaves. It is native to the Edwards Plateau region of Texas and also to northeastern Mexico (Coahuila, Nuevo León).

Yucca rupicola forms colonies of rosettes, lacking trunks above-ground but producing a branched caudex under the surface. Leaves are narrowly lanceolate, slightly succulent, twisted, up to 60 cm long but about 40 mm wide at its widest point. Flowers are pendant (drooping), bell-shaped, white or greenish. Fruit is a dry capsule up to 6 cm long.

References

External links
photo of herbarium specimen at Missouri Botanical Garden, Yucca rupicola, collected in Texas in 1900

Flora of Coahuila
Plants described in 1850
rupicola
Flora of Texas
Flora of Nuevo León